Hemiphractus bubalus, or the Ecuador horned tree frog, is a species of frog in the family Hemiphractidae. It is found in the upper Amazon Basin and lower Amazonian slopes of the Andes in northern Peru, Ecuador, and southern Colombia (Cordillera Oriental in Caquetá and Putumayo Departments).
Its natural habitat is dense cloud forest. It is typically found perching on branches of bushes and small trees. It is assumed to be a predator of other frog species. It is sensitive to habitat modification and is threatened by habitat loss.

References

bubalus
Amphibians of Colombia
Amphibians of Ecuador
Amphibians of Peru
Taxa named by Marcos Jiménez de la Espada
Amphibians described in 1870
Taxonomy articles created by Polbot